Acalolepta inaequalis is a species of beetle in the family Cerambycidae. It was described by James Clark Molesworth Gardner in 1937. It is known from India.

References

Acalolepta
Beetles described in 1937